Jacques Foucquet (active 1685–1704) was a French artist primarily active in Sweden.

Biography
Before becoming active as a painter in Stockholm, Sweden, Jacques Foucquet was employed as an officer and engineer in the court of Louis XIV. He was educated at Académie Royale de Peinture et de Sculpture in Paris, and heavily influenced by Charles Le Brun. He arrived in Sweden in 1694 with a group of other French artists, on the invitation of Nicodemus Tessin the Younger, who needed artists for the planned monumental historical and allegorical works in the newly built Royal Palace in Stockholm.

Foucquet's most famous works in the Stockholm palace are the three central ceiling panels (1700–02) of the vault in the State Apartment of the north wing, the Gallery of Charles XI of Sweden. The paintings in this gallery and in the adjoining Cabinet of Peace and Cabinet of War depict a victorious king on the battlefield during the Scanian War and the peace that followed when the Danish princess Ulrike Eleonora, sister of Christian V, married Charles XI. The iconography represent the King dressed as a classical military commander of Rome and the works are steeped in classical mythology. The ceiling was created by Jacques Foucquet and sculptor René Chauveau.

References

External links
  "Jacques Foucquet"   Oxford University Press

17th-century French painters
French male painters
18th-century French painters
17th-century Swedish painters
Swedish male painters
18th-century Swedish painters
18th-century Swedish male artists
1650s births
1704 deaths
18th-century French male artists